This is a list of episodes of the television series Octonauts, which is a British children's television series, produced by Silvergate Media for the BBC channel CBeebies.

Series overview

Episodes

Series 1 (2010–2011)
Written by: Stephanie Simpson, Billy Aronson, Glen Berger, Ian Carney, Cydne Clark, Cusi Cram, Sarah Durkee, Steve Granat, Carin Greenberg, Jonathan Greenberg, Peter K. Hirsch, Adam Idelson, Dave Ingham, Catherine Lieuwen, Myles McLeod, Allan Neuwirth, Sascha Paladino, and Gabe Pulliam.

Series 2 (2012–2013)

A second series of 22 episodes started on 19 November 2012 on the UK's CBeebies channel,
but was halted with no explanation after 10 episodes, leading to criticism from viewers. Broadcasts resumed in March 2013, but stopped a week later (with the last 7 episodes still unaired). 5 of the remaining episodes were released in May 2013 and then the last 2 episodes were released in September 2013, just before the broadcast of series 3.

Written by: Ken Pontac, Rich Fogel,	Jimmy Hibbert, Dean Stefan, Adam Peltzman, Billy Aronson, Danny Stack, Cydne Clark, Carin Greenberg, Allan Neuwirth, Nicky Phelan, Raye Lankford, Gabe Pulliam, Adam Idelson, Sam Dransfield, Davey Moore, and	Steve Clark

Series 3 (2013–2014)
A third series of 20 episodes started being broadcast by CBeebies on 4 September 2013.

Written by: Gabe Pulliam, Carin Greenberg, Adam Idelson, Adam Peltzman, Allan Neuwirth, Billy Aronson, Danny Stack, Davey Moore, Dean Stefan, Jimmy Hibbert, Ken Pontac, Nicky Phelan, Raye Lankford, Rich Fogel, Samuel Dransfield, Steve Clark, and Cydne Clark

Series 4 (2015–2016)
A fourth series of 24 episodes started being broadcast by CBeebies on 23 September 2015 and ended 14 June 2016. The episodes were released on Netflix on 15 October 2018.

Written by: Gabe Pulliam, Gordon Brassack, Kevin Burke, Nicole Dubuc, Rich Fogel, Kevin Hopps, Charlie Howell, Mark Huckerby, Adam Idelson, Sam Morrison, Nick Ostler, Kevin Seccia, Scott Sonneborn, Dean Stefan, Len Uhley, Greg Weisman, and Chris Wyatt

Specials
The specials are double-length episodes which are first broadcast during the Christmas, New Year, or Memorial Day periods before being repeated alongside regular episodes.

References

External links
 

Lists of British children's television series episodes
Lists of British animated television series episodes